Alejandro "Alex" Pelaez (born April 6, 1976) is an American former Major League Baseball player. Pelaez played in three games for the San Diego Padres in the  season. He had two hits in eight at-bats.

He was drafted by the Padres in the 42nd round of the 1998 amateur draft.

Pelaez is the former hitting coach for the Pensacola Blue Wahoos, a farm club affiliate of the Cincinnati Reds in the Southern League and current hitting coach for the Triple ALouisville Bats.

References

External links

1976 births
Living people
Baseball players from San Diego
Major League Baseball infielders
San Diego Padres players
Idaho Falls Braves players
Las Vegas Stars (baseball) players
Rancho Cucamonga Quakes players
Mobile BayBears players
Portland Beavers players
Salt Lake Stingers players
Louisville Bats players
Minor league baseball coaches
San Diego State Aztecs baseball players